The Motown Years (also known as The Motown Years 50) is a 3-disc compilation box set by American singer Michael Jackson and the group The Jackson 5, released on September 9, 2008, by Motown Records and Universal Music Group to celebrate Jackson's 50th birthday. The 50-track album features all of the hits through the Motown years from both the Jackson 5 (like "ABC", "I Want You Back", "Never Can Say Goodbye") and Michael's solo material (including "You've Got a Friend", "Ben", "Ain't No Sunshine" and "One Day in Your Life"), all of them released during their tenure with Motown (1969–1975), with the exception of "Farewell My Summer Love" and "Girl You're So Together", which were released in 1984, long after Jackson and the group had left the company.

Unlike Motown's previous Jackson 5 compilations, the 1995 4-disc Soulsation! and the 2005 2-disc Gold (both of which contain many of the same songs that appear in The Motown Years), the tracks on this 3-disc set are not ordered chronologically. Also in contrast to Soulsation!, there is no previously unreleased music. The only somewhat rare songs included are the B-sides "I'm So Happy" and "Love Song," both of which previously appeared on the 2000 version of The Jackson 5's Anthology (re-released with the title Gold in 2005), and also the 2001 "Two Classic Albums/One CD" series, as bonus tracks on Maybe Tomorrow and Lookin' Through the Windows, respectively.

A Chinese re-issue with different track selection is released on August 29, 2022 (what would've been Michael Jackson's 64th birthday) to celebrate 50th anniversary of Michael Jackson's first solo album Got to Be There.

Track listing

International Standard Edition

Chinese Limited Re-release (2022)

Charts

Weekly charts

Year-end charts

Certifications

References

External links
 

2008 compilation albums
Michael Jackson compilation albums
The Jackson 5 compilation albums